David Jonathan Escalante (born 21 May 1991) is an Argentine footballer who last played for Chilean club Cobreloa, then second-tier club.

Honours

Club
Independiente
 Copa Sudamericana: 2010
Ñublense
 Primera B (1): 2020

References

External links
 
 
 David Escalante at playmakerstats.com (English version of ceroacero.es)

1991 births
People from Tres Isletas
Living people
Argentine footballers
Argentine expatriate footballers
Club Atlético Independiente footballers
San Telmo footballers
Santiago Morning footballers
A.C. Barnechea footballers
Ñublense footballers
Cobreloa footballers
Argentine Primera División players
Primera B Metropolitana players
Primera B de Chile players
Chilean Primera División players
Expatriate footballers in Chile
Argentine expatriates in Chile
Argentine expatriate sportspeople in Chile
Association football forwards
Sportspeople from Chaco Province